Brown County High School is a public high school in Nashville, Indiana.

See also
 List of high schools in Indiana
 Western Indiana Conference
 Nashville, Indiana

References

External links 
 Official Website

Public high schools in Indiana
Brown County, Indiana